The 2003 Corby Borough Council election took place on 1 May 2003 to elect members of Corby Borough Council in Northamptonshire, England. The Labour Party retained overall control of the council, which it had held continuously since 1979.

Results Summary

The overall results, using average ward votes for the total number of votes cast, were as follows:

(Vote counts shown are ward averages)

Ward-by-Ward Results

Central Ward (3 seats)

(Vote count shown is ward average)

Danesholme Ward (3 seats)

(Vote count shown is ward average)

East Ward (2 seats)

(Vote count shown is ward average)

Hazlewood Ward (3 seats)

(Vote count shown is ward average)

Hillside Ward (1 seat)

(Vote count shown is ward average)

Kingswood Ward (3 seats)

(Vote count shown is ward average)

Lloyds Ward (3 seats)

(Vote count shown is ward average)

Lodge Park (3 seats)

(Vote count shown is ward average)

Rural East Ward (2 seats)

(Vote count shown is ward average)

Rural North Ward (1 seats)

(Vote count shown is ward average)

Rural West Ward (1 seat)

(Vote count shown is ward average)

(Background: Bob Rutt defected from the Liberal Democrats after the 1999 Borough Council elections)

Shire Lodge (2 seats)

(Vote count shown is ward average)

West Ward (2 seats)

(Vote count shown is ward average)

See also
 Corby (UK Parliament constituency)

References

2003 English local elections
2003
2000s in Northamptonshire